Frederick Owen Roberts (2 July 1876 – 23 October 1941) was a Labour Party politician in the United Kingdom.

Roberts worked as a compositor and became active in the Typographical Association, serving on its executive council.  He was also active in the Labour Party, and served on its National Executive Committee for many years.

He was elected at the 1918 general election as Member of Parliament (MP) for West Bromwich, defeating the sitting Conservative MP Viscount Lewisham.  He held the seat until the Conservatives regained it in 1931, but was re-elected at the 1935 general election.

He was sworn as a Privy Councillor in 1924, when he was appointed as Minister of Pensions in Ramsay MacDonald's First Labour Government. He held the same post in the 1929–1931 Labour Government.

He resigned his seat on 3 April 1941, and died later that year, aged 65.

Notes

References

External links 
 

1876 births
1941 deaths
Labour Party (UK) MPs for English constituencies
Typographical Association-sponsored MPs
UK MPs 1918–1922
UK MPs 1922–1923
UK MPs 1923–1924
UK MPs 1924–1929
UK MPs 1929–1931
UK MPs 1935–1945
Members of the Privy Council of the United Kingdom
Chairs of the Labour Party (UK)